Trélissac Football Club is a French association football team founded in 1950. It is based in Trélissac, France and plays at the Stade Firmin Daudou in the town.

Current squad

References

External links
  

1950 establishments in France
Association football clubs established in 1950
Sport in Dordogne
Football clubs in Nouvelle-Aquitaine